Agu is a surname and given name.

AGU may also refer to:

Universities 
 Abdullah Gül University, in Kayseri, Turkey
 Aichi Gakuin University, in central Japan
 Al Ghurair University, in the United Arab Emirates
 Aoyama Gakuin University, in Shibuya, Tokyo, Japan
 Arabian Gulf University, in Al-Manāmah, Bahrain

Organizations 
 American Geophysical Union, an international organization of geoscientists
 Lic. Jesús Terán Peredo International Airport (IATA airport code), located in Aguascalientes, Mexico
 Air Guadeloupe, an airline operating in 1994-2000
 Asian Gymnastics Union, a continental union under the International Federation of Gymnastics (FIG)

Science and technology 
 Address generation unit, a part of computer processors involved in performing memory accesses
 Aspartylglucosaminuria, a rare genetic illness
 a codon for the amino acid serine

Other uses 
 All Grown Up!, an animated television series
 Attorney General of Brazil
 Awakatek language (ISO 639-3 language code), spoken in Guatemala